Family Skeleton is a 1949 comedy mystery novel by the American writer Doris Miles Disney.

Adaptation
In 1950 it was made into a film Stella by Twentieth Century Fox, starring Ann Sheridan and Victor Mature.

References

Bibliography
 Goble, Alan. The Complete Index to Literary Sources in Film. Walter de Gruyter, 1999.

1949 American novels
Novels by Doris Miles Disney
American mystery novels
American novels adapted into films
Doubleday (publisher) books